Puya gilmartiniae is a species in the genus Puya. This species is endemic to Chile.

References

Chilean Bromeliaceae: diversity, distribution and evaluation of conservation status (Published online: 10 March 2009)

gilmartiniae
Endemic flora of Chile